Pelegrina is a spider genus of the family Salticidae (jumping spiders). They are found throughout North America. Many of the species in Pelegrina were previously placed in the genera Metaphidippus, and before that, Dendryphantes. The genus was originally described in 1930 by the Spanish arachnologist Pelegrín Franganillo Balboa, who named it after himself.

Species
, the World Spider Catalog accepted the following species:

 Pelegrina aeneola (Curtis, 1892) – North America
 Pelegrina arizonensis (Peckham & Peckham, 1901) – North America
 Pelegrina balia Maddison, 1996 – United States
 Pelegrina bicuspidata (F. O. P-Cambridge, 1901) – Mexico, Guatemala
 Pelegrina bunites Maddison, 1996 – United States, Mexico
 Pelegrina chaimona Maddison, 1996 – United States, Mexico
 Pelegrina chalceola Maddison, 1996 – United States
 Pelegrina clavator Maddison, 1996 – Mexico
 Pelegrina clemata (Levi, 1951) – United States, Canada
 Pelegrina dithalea Maddison, 1996 – United States
 Pelegrina edrilana Maddison, 1996 – Mexico
 Pelegrina exigua (Banks, 1892) – United States
 Pelegrina flaviceps (Kaston, 1973) – United States, Canada
 Pelegrina flavipes (Peckham & Peckham, 1888) – United States, Canada
 Pelegrina furcata (F. O. P.-Cambridge, 1901) – United States, Mexico
 Pelegrina galathea (Walckenaer, 1837) – Canada to Costa Rica, Bermuda
 Pelegrina helenae (Banks, 1921) – United States
 Pelegrina huachuca Maddison, 1996 – United States
 Pelegrina insignis (Banks, 1892) – United States, Canada
 Pelegrina kastoni Maddison, 1996 – United States, Mexico
 Pelegrina montana (Emerton, 1891) – United States, Canada
 Pelegrina morelos Maddison, 1996 – Mexico
 Pelegrina neoleonis Maddison, 1996 – Mexico
 Pelegrina ochracea (F. O. P.-Cambridge, 1901) – Mexico, Guatemala
 Pelegrina orestes Maddison, 1996 – United States, Mexico
 Pelegrina pallidata (F. O. P.-Cambridge, 1901) – Mexico to Nicaragua
 Pelegrina peckhamorum (Kaston, 1973) – United States
 Pelegrina pervaga (Peckham & Peckham, 1909) – United States
 Pelegrina proterva (Walckenaer, 1837) – United States, Canada
 Pelegrina proxima (Peckham & Peckham, 1901) – Bahama Islands, Cuba, Hispaniola, Jamaica
 Pelegrina sabinema Maddison, 1996 – United States
 Pelegrina sandaracina Maddison, 1996 – Mexico to Nicaragua
 Pelegrina tillandsiae (Kaston, 1973) – United States
 Pelegrina tristis Maddison, 1996 – United States
 Pelegrina variegata (F. O. P.-Cambridge, 1901) – Mexico to Panama
 Pelegrina verecunda (Chamberlin & Gertsch, 1930) – United States, Mexico
 Pelegrina volcana Maddison, 1996 – Panama
 Pelegrina yucatecana Maddison, 1996 – Mexico

References

External links

 Pictures of P. arizonensis
 Pictures of P. flavipedes
 Picture of P. galathea (free for noncommercial use)

Salticidae
Salticidae genera
Spiders of North America